GLA is the fourth studio album by Scottish alternative rock band Twin Atlantic. It was released on 9 September 2016. The album was produced by Jacknife Lee.

On 2 September 2016 Annie Mac premiered lead single "No Sleep" as the Hottest Record in the World on BBC Radio 1. On 16 September 2016, GLA became the band's second top 10 charting album in the UK debuting at #9 on the UK album charts, #1 on the Rock Album Charts and #3 on the Scottish album charts

Reception

The album was included at number 10 on Kerrang!s "The Top 50 Rock Albums Of 2016" list.

Track listing

Charts

References

2016 albums
Twin Atlantic albums
Red Bull Records albums